Lay's Stax is a potato chip snack food produced by Frito-Lay, a subsidiary of PepsiCo. It was introduced in 2003 as direct competition for Procter & Gamble's (later Kellogg's in 2012) Pringles.

Stax compared to Pringles 
Lay's Stax are heavier and thicker than Pringles. The shape of Stax is a simple curve called a hyperbolic cylinder, while Pringles are formed into a double-curve known as a hyperbolic paraboloid. Stax have the flavoring spread across the inside curve of the chip while Pringles have them across the outside curve. Stax are packaged in plastic canisters  while Pringles are packaged in canisters made of cardboard and aluminum.

In the UK, Stax (under the Walkers brand) are packed in all-cardboard cans. In China, Stax are packaged in a fashion similar to that of Pringles in America, and the chips themselves are further packaged in plastic containers within the can.

Rebranding 
Whereas in nations such as China Lay's Stax are branded under the same name they were created and are primarily distributed, in some nations the chips are named differently.

Since late 2006, Lay's Stax have been available in Brazil under the name "Elma Chips Stax", deriving their name from that of a Brazilian division of the PepsiCo corporation known as Elma Chips. However, the yellow lids atop the cans are marked with the Lay's Stax brand name typical in most other regions of the world.

See also
Munchos
List of brand name snack foods

References

External links
  

Brand name snack foods
Frito-Lay brands
Products introduced in 2003
Brand name potato chips and crisps